The 9M730 Burevestnik ("Petrel", NATO reporting name: SSC-X-9 Redrod) is a Russian experimental nuclear-powered, nuclear-armed cruise missile under development for the Russian Armed Forces. The missile has an essentially unlimited range.

The Burevestnik is one of the six new Russian strategic weapons unveiled by Russian President Vladimir Putin on 1 March 2018.

History

Origins
The Soviet Union and later Russia have been uncertain since the 1980s to what extent their ICBM nuclear arsenal is nullified by the United States' anti-ballistic missile system Strategic Defense Initiative, proposed during the Reagan Administration and commonly known as the Star Wars program. This type of weapon flies under the ballistic weapon shield and is part of President Putin's broader program to attempt to advance Russian nuclear strike capability.

Development
The Russian defense industry began developing an intercontinental-range nuclear-powered cruise missile capable of penetrating any interceptor-based missile defense system. It is said to have unlimited range and ability to evade missile defenses. A major stage of trials of the cruise missile of the Burevestnik complex, the tests of the nuclear power unit, were successfully completed in January 2019.

The cruise missile received the name Burevestnik (which translates as Storm petrel, a seabird) as a result of an open vote on the website of the Ministry of Defence of Russia.

Design speculation
According to Vladimir Putin and the Russian Ministry of Defense, the missile's dimensions are comparable to those of the Kh-101 cruise missile and it is equipped with a small-sized nuclear power unit. The claimed operational range is orders of magnitude greater than that of Kh-101. As shown in an official presentation, the missile starts from an inclined launcher using a detachable rocket booster.

Pavel Ivanov from VPK-news states that the cruise missile is one and a half to two times the size of the Kh-101, the wings of the Burevestnik are rooted "on top of the fuselage, rather than below it like on the Kh-101", and also notes that there are "characteristic protrusions where air is most likely heated by the nuclear reactor". According to Ivanov, the mass of the Burevestnik is "several times to order of magnitude" greater than that of the Kh-101, which eliminates Tu-160 and Tu-95 as potential carriers of the missile.

According to Nezavisimaya Gazeta, Burevestnik is a nuclear thermal rocket with a solid-fueled booster engine. The nose has the shape of an "ellipse  ×  in size".

Military expert Anton Lavrov in the Izvestia article suggested that the design of the Burevestnik uses a ramjet engine, which, unlike the more traditional propulsion systems for nuclear weapons, will have radioactive exhaust throughout its entire operation.

Stratfor, an American geopolitical intelligence platform, assumes that Burevestnik utilizes a turbojet engine and a liquid-fueled booster.

According to James Hockenhull, the UK's Chief of Defence Intelligence (CDI), the Burevestnik is a "sub-sonic nuclear-powered cruise missile system which has global reach and would allow attack from unexpected directions". Per Hockenhull, the missile would have "a near indefinite loiter time".

Nyonoksa radiation accident

On 9 August 2019, the Russian nuclear energy agency Rosatom confirmed a release of radioactivity at the State Central Navy Testing Range at Nyonoksa near Severodvinsk in northern Russia and stated it was linked to an accident involving the test of an "isotope power source for a liquid-fuelled rocket engine".
Five weapons scientists were killed in the accident. Nonproliferation expert Jeffrey Lewis and Federation of American Scientists fellow Ankit Panda suspect the incident resulted from a test of the Burevestnik cruise missile. However, other arms control experts disputed the assertions: Ian Williams of the Center for Strategic and International Studies and James Acton of the Carnegie Endowment for International Peace expressed skepticism over Moscow's financial and technical capabilities to field the weapon, while Michael Kofman of the Wilson Center concluded that the explosion was probably not related to Burevestnik but instead to the testing of another military platform.

According to CNBC, the explosion occurred during an attempt to recover a missile from the seabed which was lost during a previously failed test. On 10 October, Thomas DiNanno, member of the United States delegation to the United Nations General Assembly First Committee, stated that the "August 8th 'Skyfall' incident [...] was the result of a nuclear reaction that occurred during the recovery of a Russian nuclear-powered cruise missile", which "remained on the bed of the White Sea since its failed test early last year".

On 26 August, Aleksei Karpov, Russia's envoy to international organizations in Vienna, stated that the accident was linked to the development of weapons which Russia had to begin creating as "one of the tit-for-tat measures in the wake of the United States' withdrawal from the Anti-Ballistic Missile Treaty".

On 21 November, at the ceremony of presentation of posthumous awards to the dead men's families, Vladimir Putin stated that the scientists killed in the August 8th explosion had been testing an “unparalleled” weapon: “We are talking about the most advanced and unparalleled technical ideas and solutions about weapons design to ensure Russia’s sovereignty and security for decades to come". He also noted that the "weapon is to be perfected regardless of anything".

Operators

See also
 Status-6 Oceanic Multipurpose System (Poseidon) – a Russian nuclear torpedo / drone submarine, also built around a miniature nuclear propulsion unit
 Supersonic Low Altitude Missile (SLAM) – an American project to develop a nuclear-powered cruise missile, cancelled in 1964
 Project Pluto – the nuclear ramjet engine development program for SLAM

References

External links
 
 
 
 
  - MoD of the Russian Federation official website.

2018 establishments in Russia
Nuclear cruise missiles of Russia
Nuclear propulsion
Nuclear-powered aircraft
Post–Cold War weapons of Russia
Surface-to-surface missiles
Weapons of Russia